James Gregory Garrison (born 1948) is an American attorney and radio host.

Personal background
Garrison was born in Indianapolis, Indiana. He graduated from Indiana University Bloomington in 1970 with a B.S. and the Indiana University Robert H. McKinney School of Law in 1973 with a J.D. Garrison is married to Phyllis, also an attorney.

Legal career
With his brother Chris Garrison, Greg Garrison  is a lawyer in the Garrison Law Firm, LLC specializing in personal injury, business law, and general litigation.

Previously, Garrison presided over civil cases in the Marion County, Indiana Prosecutor's Office. Garrison gained national attention in 1992 as special prosecutor in the rape case of boxer Mike Tyson. He has also served as a CBS News legal analyst.

Radio career
Garrison debuted on Indianapolis news/talk station WIBC on June 2, 1997, and his show became syndicated statewide on Network Indiana on January 3, 2000, in replacement of Mike Pence, who would later become Governor of Indiana and Vice President of the United States. In April 2017, Garrison announced his retirement from radio, with his final show taking place on June 9.

References

External links
 Greg Garrison interview

1948 births
Indiana lawyers
Radio personalities from Indiana
Indiana University Robert H. McKinney School of Law alumni
Indiana University Bloomington alumni
People from Indianapolis
People from Hamilton County, Indiana
Living people